Anderberg is a Swedish surname. Notable people with the surname include:

 Axel Anderberg (1860–1937), Swedish architect 
 Bengt Anderberg (1920–2008), Swedish writer
 Bertil Anderberg (1913–1991), Swedish film actor
 Erik Anderberg (1892–1990), Swedish Navy vice admiral
 Olle Anderberg (1919–2003), Swedish sport wrestler

Swedish-language surnames